Andoor is a village in the Kottayam district of Kerala, India.  The village is located approximately 9 km north-west of Palai on the road towards Kuravilangad.

Location
Andoor is part of Marangattupilly Gram panchayat of Uzhavoor Block Panchayati raj.  Administratively Andoor is part of Kurichithanam revenue village of Meenachil Thalook.  Andoor also belongs the Kaduthurithy Legislative constituency and Kottayam Loksabha.

Economy
The village has many paddy fields and small rivers, and has stops for local buses and auto-rickshaws. Most of the people depend on agriculture, with rice, rubber, coconut among the main crops.

Landmarks
Government Ayurvedic Hospital, located near to Andoor Junction.
Government Nursing college, located near to Andoor Junction.

Nearest Places
Marangattupilly
Pala
Palackattumala
Uzhavoor
Kudakkachira
Ramapuram
Kadaplamattom
Vayala

References

Villages in Kottayam district